The New Fred and Barney Show is an American animated television series revival and spin-off of The Flintstones produced by Hanna-Barbera that aired on NBC from February 3 to October 20, 1979. The series marked the first time Henry Corden performed the voice of Fred Flintstone for a regular series.

Overview
These new episodes were composed of the traditional Flintstones cast of characters such as Fred and Barney's children Pebbles and Bamm-Bamm as toddlers, after having been depicted as teenagers on The Pebbles and Bamm-Bamm Show on CBS in 1971; they returned to the form of teenagers on The Flintstone Comedy Show in 1980 on NBC. Some plots were familiar Flintstones stories while others consisted of new misadventures with witches and werewolves, as well as spoofs of late 1970s fads.

A second season of seven new episodes combined with reruns of The New Fred and Barney Show were broadcast on the package program Fred and Barney Meet the Thing and later on Fred and Barney Meet the Shmoo.

Like many animated series created by Hanna-Barbera in the 1970s, the show contained a laugh track.

Episodes

Season 1

Season 2

1 These episodes, as well as first-season repeats, aired as part of Fred and Barney Meet the Thing

Voice cast
 Henry Corden as Fred Flintstone
 Mel Blanc as Barney Rubble, Dino
 Jean Vander Pyl as Wilma Flintstone, Pebbles Flintstone
 Gay Autterson as Betty Rubble
 Don Messick as Bamm-Bamm Rubble, various guest characters
 John Stephenson as Mr. Slate, various guest characters

References

External links
 
 

The Flintstones spin-offs
1979 American television series debuts
1979 American television series endings
1970s American animated television series
American animated television spin-offs
American children's animated comedy television series
Television series by Hanna-Barbera
NBC original programming
English-language television shows
Television series set in prehistory